Simms Island is a former marsh island in San Francisco Bay. It appears as an island on a USGS map in 1897; it is labeled in a 1954 map, but fully connected to the mainland.

References

Islands of Marin County, California
Islands of San Francisco Bay
Islands of Northern California